DXSO (99.7 FM) Radyo Pilipinas Marawi is a radio station owned and operated by the City Government of Marawi. The station's studio is located inside the Mindanao State University Campus, 4th St., Marawi.

The frequency was formerly known as Salam Radio from July 14, 2005, to March 2016, when it was taken over by DXSO, which was formerly broadcast on 774 AM. In 2018, the City Government of Marawi took over the station's operations.

References

Radio stations established in 1964
Radio stations in Lanao del Sur